Tarell Lameek Brown (born January 6, 1985) is a former American football cornerback. He was drafted by the San Francisco 49ers in the fifth round of the 2007 NFL Draft. He played college football for the University of Texas.

High school career
Brown played for North Mesquite High School in Mesquite, Texas. He played in the 2003 U.S. Army All-American Bowl.

College career
Brown played defensive back for the Texas Longhorns college football team. He was a member of the National Championship team that played in the  2006 Rose Bowl National Championship Game against USC. Brown was injured in the fourth quarter of the game and left with a broken arm.

On September 4, 2006, Brown was one of two UT players and one former UT player were arrested in Austin and charged for marijuana possession, a Class B misdemeanor.  The two current players, Tarell Brown and Tyrell Gatewood, were suspended from the team and did not play on September 9, 2006 game against the 2006 Ohio State Buckeyes football team.  Noted for his continual legal problems, Brown was also charged with a Class A misdemeanor weapons violation for being in possession of a firearm without a permit.    It was later revealed that Brown and Gatewood had been tasered during the arrest, although the reasons for such treatment have not been fully established.

At the time of the arrest, Tarell Brown was listed as a starting cornerback.

Professional career

San Francisco 49ers
Brown, was drafted by the San Francisco 49ers in the fifth round (148th overall) in the 2007 NFL Draft.  During his rookie season, he played in nine games, particularly on special teams and finished the season with two tackles. Brown partially tore his Anterior Cruciate Ligament and tore his Medial collateral ligament completely in Week 17. He was expected to be fine at the start of training Camp.

In week 16 of the 2008 season, Brown intercepted a pass from Rams quarterback Marc Bulger in the final minute of the game, capping off a come-from-behind win in the fourth quarter.

In 2011, he was named the starter at Right Cornerback taking the spot from Shawntae Spencer. He started all sixteen games and had career-highs with 4 interceptions and 14 pass deflections as he helped the 49ers become one of the elite defenses in the NFL.

In the 2012 season, Brown and the 49ers appeared in Super Bowl XLVII. In the game, he had three combined tackles, a forced fumble, and a fumble recovery as the 49ers fell to the Baltimore Ravens by a score of 34–31.

Oakland Raiders
Brown agreed to a one-year deal worth $3.5 million for the Oakland Raiders in March 2014.

New England Patriots
Brown agreed to terms with the New England Patriots on July 23, 2015. On October 17, Brown was placed on injured reserve with a foot injury.

References

External links

Oakland Raiders bio
San Francisco 49ers bio
Texas Longhorns bio

1985 births
Living people
Players of American football from New York City
American football cornerbacks
Texas Longhorns football players
San Francisco 49ers players
Oakland Raiders players
New England Patriots players